Bruce Young may refer to:
 Bruce Young (American football), former American football coach
 Bruce Young (politician), Australian Liberal National politician
 Bruce W. Young (born 1950), American essayist and author
 Bruce A. Young (born 1956), American television, film, and stage actor
 Bruce Young (police officer) (1888–1952), New Zealand baker, policeman, unionist and police commissioner